Petar Andrejić (born 1972) is a politician in Serbia. He served in the Assembly of Vojvodina from 2000 to 2016 as a member of the Democratic Party (Demokratska stranka, DS). Andrejić joined the Serbian Progressive Party (Srpska napredna stranka, SNS) in late 2016 and has served as president of the Starčevo community council.

Private career
Andrejić has identified as a chemical technician and a journalist.

Politician
Andrejić was a member of the Serbian National Renewal (Srpska narodna obnova, SNO) party in the early 1990s and appeared on its electoral lists for the Zrenjanin division in the 1992 and 1993 Serbian parliamentary elections. In both cases, the list failed to cross the electoral threshold for assembly representation. He subsequently left this party to join the DS.

Assembly of Vojvodina
Andrejić was first elected to the Vojvodina assembly in the 2000 provincial election, winning in Pančevo's seventh division. The DS contested this election as part of the Democratic Opposition of Serbia (Demokratska opozicija Srbije, DOS), which won a landslide victory, and Andrejić served as a supporter of the provincial government.

Vojvodina introduced a system of mixed proportional representation for the 2004 provincial election, and Andrejić was elected for Pančevo's redistributed second division. He was re-elected for the same district in 2008 and 2012. The DS was the dominant party in Vojvodina's provincial government throughout these years, and he continued to serve as a supporter of the administration. In his last term, he was a member of the information committee and the committee for determining the identity of provincial regulations in languages of official use.

Andrejić was also elected to the Pančevo city assembly in the 2000, 2004, 2008, and 2012 local elections. In 2000, he was elected for Starčevo's first division; after this election, Serbia introduced a system of full proportional representation at the local level.

Since 2016
Andrejić left the DS in 2016 and contested the 2016 local election in Pančevo at the head of his own list, which did not cross the electoral threshold. He also led the Starčevo Movement group, which won a majority victory in elections for Starčevo's community council, and was named as the council's president. In a Politika article from August 2016, he argued for Starčevo becoming a separate municipality.

In December 2016, Andrejič led the Starčevo Movement into the Progressive Party.

Electoral record

Provincial (Vojvodina)

Local (City of Pančevo)

References

1972 births
Living people
Politicians from Pančevo
Members of the Assembly of Vojvodina
Serbian National Renewal politicians
Democratic Party (Serbia) politicians
Serbian Progressive Party politicians